Christmas Day refers to the day of December 25, commonly known as simply Christmas. 

It may also refer to:

Music
 "Christmas Day" (Squeeze song)
 "Christmas Day" (Michael W. Smith song)
 "Christmas Day", a song from the musical Promises, Promises
 "Christmas Day", a song by The Beach Boys from The Beach Boys' Christmas Album
 "Christmas Day", a song by Dido from A Very Special Christmas 5
 "Christmas Day", a song by MxPx from Punk Rawk Christmas
 "Christmas Day", a song by Ian Kelly (songwriter), released in 2014
 "Christmas Day", a song by Thunder (band), released in 2017

See also
 Christmas Day Plot, a conspiracy made by the Indian revolutionary movement 
 Christmas Day in the Morning, the first of several Christmas albums by Burl Ives
 Christmas Day (Trading) Act 2004, an Act of Parliament of the Parliament of the United Kingdom